Attrition may refer to
Attrition warfare, the military strategy of wearing down the enemy by continual losses in personnel and material
War of Attrition, fought between Egypt and Israel from 1968 to 1970
War of attrition (game), a model of aggression in game theory
Loss of personnel by withdrawal (military)
Attrition (research), loss of participants during an experiment
Attrition (dental), loss of tooth structure by mechanical forces from opposing teeth
Attrition (erosion), the wearing away of rocks in rivers or the sea
Attrition (film), also known as Final Mission, 2018 american film
Imperfect contrition, also known as attrition, in Catholic theology
Customer attrition, loss of business clients or customers
Language attrition, loss of first language ability by multilingual speakers
Second language attrition, loss of second language ability

Proper names
Attrition (band), an electronic music band
Attrition (website), a security website

See also
Attrition rate
Deterioration (disambiguation)
Retention (disambiguation)